The 2008 WNBA season was the 12th and final season for the Houston Comets. The Comets were not able to return to the postseason for the first time since 2006. By season's end, Comets owner Hilton Koch put the franchise up for sale less than two years after he bought it.

Offseason

Expansion Draft
 Roneeka Hodges was selected in the 2008 Expansion Draft for the Atlanta Dream, and subsequently traded her to the Seattle Storm, along with the No. 4 pick in the 2008 WNBA Draft for Iziane Castro Marques and the No. 8 overall pick.

WNBA Draft

Transactions
 February 20: Signed free agent Mwadi Mabika.
 February 25: Re-signed free agent Tamecka Dixon.
 February 27: Signed Erin Grant to a training camp contract.
 March 6: Re-signed Barbara Turner, then traded her to the Connecticut Sun for Megan Mahoney.
 March 7: Signed free agent Shannon Johnson.
 March 28: Re-signed free agent Michelle Snow.
 March 31: Re-signed free agent Tina Thompson.
 April 10: Signed Debbie Remmerde to a training camp contract.
 April 14: Signed Tamara Ransburg and Marcedes Walker to training camp contracts.
 April 15: Waived Anastasia Kostaki.
 April 16: Signed Sequoia Holmes to a training camp contract.
 April 19: Waived Tamara Ransburg.
 April 24: Waived Debbie Remmerde.
 April 29: Waived Erin Grant, Megan Mahoney, Erin Myrick and Crystal Smith.
 May 15: Waived Crystal Kelly.
 May 16: Waived Latasha Byears.
 June 15: Waived Marcedes Walker.
 June 25: Re-signed Latasha Byears.
 June 27: Waived Ashley Shields.
 July 5: Signed Roneeka Hodges to a seven-day contract.
 July 16: Signed Roneeka Hodges for the remainder of the season.

Preseason

Regular season
In a game against the Detroit Shock on July 24, Shock player Nancy Lieberman broke her own record for being the oldest player in the WNBA. Lieberman, a Hall of Famer since 1999, was 39 years old when she played with Phoenix during the league's first year in 1997. 

Nancy Lieberman played nine minutes and had two assists. One of the assists included a no-look pass in the closing minutes of the Detroit Shock's 79-61 loss to the Houston Comets on July 24.

Season standings

Season Schedule

The September 12th game against Sacramento Monarchs was postponed due to Hurricane Ike.

Player stats

Regular season

Roster

Awards and honors
Matee Ajavon, Guard, All-WNBA Rookie Team

Final Days
On December 1, 2008, the WNBA announced a plan to fold the team, which resulted in the loss of 37 jobs.  A dispersal draft took place on December 8, 2008. Before the team folded, they were possibly going to move to Las Vegas, Nevada, but the plan didn't work out.

What turned out to be the team's final home game in its history was relocated from the Reliant Arena to the Strahan Coliseum on the campus of Texas State due to Hurricane Ike.  The game was played on September 15, 2008 as the Comets defeated the Sacramento Monarchs 90-81.

References

External links 
 Rockets/Monarchs game postponed

Houston Comets seasons
Houston
Houston